The UK Singles Chart is one of many music charts compiled by the Official Charts Company that calculates the best-selling singles of the week in the United Kingdom. Before 2004, the chart was only based on the sales of physical singles. This list shows singles that peaked in the Top 10 of the UK Singles Chart during 1981, as well as singles which peaked in 1980 and 1982 but were in the top 10 in 1981. The entry date is when the single appeared in the top 10 for the first time (week ending, as published by the Official Charts Company, which is six days after the chart is announced).

One-hundred and forty-five singles were in the top ten in 1981. Ten singles from 1980 remained in the top 10 for several weeks at the beginning of the year, while "Ant Rap" by Adam and the Ants, "I'll Find My Way Home" by Jon and Vangelis, "It Must Be Love" by Madness, "The Land of Make Believe" by Bucks Fizz and "Mirror Mirror (Mon Amour)" by Dollar were released in 1981 but did not reach their peak until 1982. "Antmusic" by Adam and the Ants, "Happy Xmas (War is Over)" by  John Lennon, Yoko Ono, the Plastic Ono Band with the Harlem Community Center Choir and "Imagine" by John Lennon were the singles from 1980 to reach their peak in 1981. Thirty artists scored multiple entries in the top 10 in 1981. Duran Duran, The Human League, Kim Wilde, Shakin' Stevens and Ultravox were among the many artists who achieved their first UK charting top 10 single in 1981.

The 1980 Christmas number-one, "There's No One Quite Like Grandma" by St. Winifred's School Choir remained at number-one for the first week of 1981. The first new number-one single of the year was "Imagine" by the late former Beatles singer John Lennon. Overall, twenty different singles peaked at number-one in 1981, with Adam and the Ants, John Lennon and Shakin' Stevens (2) having the joint most singles hit that position.

Background

Multiple entries
One-hundred and forty-five singles charted in the top 10 in 1981, with one-hundred and thirty-three singles reaching their peak this year.

Thirty artists scored multiple entries in the top 10 in 1981. Adam and the Ants secured the record for most top 10 hits in 1981 with six hit singles.

Soft Cell were one of a number of artists with two top-ten entries, including the number-one single "Tainted Love". Bucks Fizz, Diana Ross, Kim Wilde, Queen and Ultravox were among the other artists who had multiple top 10 entries in 1981.

Chart debuts
Forty-eight artists achieved their first top 10 single in 1981, either as a lead or featured artist. Of these, six went on to record another hit single that year: Bucks Fizz, Chas & Dave, Kim Wilde, Soft Cell, Starsound and Ultravox. The Human League and Toyah both had two more entries in 1981. Shakin' Stevens had three other entries in his breakthrough year.

The following table (collapsed on desktop site) does not include acts who had previously charted as part of a group and secured their first top 10 solo single. 

Notes
Phil Collins had his first solo credit independent of Genesis with "In the Air Tonight", peaking at number two. Headgirl was a collaboration between Motörhead and Girlschool, the former having recorded a top 10 single previously, "The Golden Years (EP)", with the latter making their top ten debut.

Graham Bonnet's only top 10 single as a solo artist, "Night Games", reached number 6 in 1981. He had scored hit singles as a member of Rainbow and in the duo The Marbles with Trevor Gordon. Lionel Richie's official chart debut on his own came this year when "Endless Love" peaked at number 7. He had previously made an impression on the top 10 with the group Commodores.

Godley & Creme had scored top 10 hits in the 1970s as members of the groups Hotlegs and 10cc. They achieved their first top 10 as a duo in 1981 with "Under Your Thumb", which peaked at number three.

Songs from films
Original songs from various films entered the top 10 throughout the year. These included "Flash" (Flash Gordon), "Chi Mai" (The Professional) and "For Your Eyes Only" (For Your Eyes Only).

Best-selling singles
The Human League had the best-selling single of the year with "Don't You Want Me". The single spent nine weeks in the top 10 (including five weeks at number one), sold over 1.15 million copies and was certified platinum by the BPI. "Tainted Love" by Soft Cell came in second place, selling more than 1.04 million copies. Adam and the Ants' "Stand and Deliver", "Prince Charming" by Adam and the Ants and Shakin' Stevens' "This Ole House" made up the top five. Singles by Ultravox, Michael Jackson, Bucks Fizz, Joe Dolce Music Theatre and The Tweets were also in the top ten best-selling singles of the year.

Top-ten singles
Key

Entries by artist

The following table shows artists who achieved two or more top 10 entries in 1981, including singles that reached their peak in 1980 or 1982. The figures include both main artists and featured artists, while appearances on ensemble charity records are also counted for each artist. The total number of weeks an artist spent in the top ten in 1981 is also shown.

Notes

 "The Land of Make Believe" reached its peak of number-one on 16 January 1982 (week ending).
 "Imagine", "Happy Xmas (War is Over)" and "(Just Like) Starting Over" all re-entered the top 10 following John Lennon's murder on 8 December 1980. "Imagine" was first released as a single in the UK in 1975 and peaked at number 6. "Happy Xmas (War is Over)" was first released as a single in the UK in 1972 and peaked at number 4. Both singles reached new peaks of numbers 1 and 2, respectively, following Lennon's death.
 "Woman" was the first official Lennon single released after his death.
 Headgirl was a supergroup made up of Motörhead and Girlschool.
 "Making Your Mind Up" was the United Kingdom's winning entry at the Eurovision Song Contest in 1981.
 “Chi Mai” was used as the theme song for the BBC television series ‘’The Life and Times of David Lloyd George’’.
 "Attention to Me" re-entered the top 10 at number 9 on 2 May 1981 (week ending).
 Starsound were known as Stars on 45 in their home country, the Netherlands.
 "Ossie's Dream (Spurs Are On Their Way to Wembley)" was released by Tottenham Hotspur F.C. to celebrate reaching the FA Cup Final in 1981.
 Chas & Dave's appearance on "Ossie's Dream (Spurs Are On Their Way to Wembley)" is uncredited but is counted in their discography.
 Figure includes song that first charted in 1980 but peaked in 1981.
 Figure includes song that peaked in 1982.
 Figure includes song that peaked in 1980.
 Figure includes uncredited appearance on Tottenham Hotspur FA Cup Final Squad's "Ossie's Dream (Spurs Are on Their Way to Wembley)".
 Figure includes the group project "St Valentine's Day Massacre (EP)" with Girlschool.

See also
1981 in British music
List of number-one singles from the 1980s (UK)

References
General

Specific

External links
1981 singles chart archive at the Official Charts Company (click on relevant week)
The Official Top 50 best-selling songs of 1981 at the Official Charts Company

United Kingdom
Top 10 singles
1981